Nightmare Academy: Monster Madness is the second book in the Nightmare Academy series by author Dean Lorey. It is preceded by Nightmare Academy: Monster Hunters. It follows the fictional events in the lives of characters Charlie Benjamin and his friends, Theodore Dagget and Violet Sweet, in their attempt to prevent the remaining Named from traveling back to Earth and summoning The Fifth.

Plot
The novel begins as Charlie and friends get ready for their final exams, which they hope will allow them to graduate and become Addys. They are sent by Rex, Tabitha and Pinch to Bungalow C, owned by Dora and her father Barry. Dora is not old enough to train at the Nightmare Academy yet, so does not know Nethercreatures can portal in through her nightmares. 

The three friends find and begin to banish three gremlins, before a Class 2 Darkling appears and eats the gremlins. Violet begins closing the portal to the first ring of the Nether when a Class 4 Netherleaper captures her.

Charlie and Rex save Violet, who informs them the Netherleaper was taking her to the Guardian. Hearing this, Rex, Tabitha, Pinch, Charlie, Theodore and Violet portal to the Nightmare Division to tell the Headmaster. She explains that the remaining two Named, Slagguron and Tyrannus, were trying to poison the Guardian. The Guardian guards a place called the Anomaly, a weak spot between the Nether and Earth, which Slagguron and Tyrannus wish to escape through.

Suddenly, they are called to the Nightmare Division by the Director, Drake. He informs the group that he remembers what they did to him in the first book; he has regained his memories. They form a truce and agree not to steal his memories and in return he will be civilised towards Charlie and friends.

Outside, they hear Tyrannus declare they have killed the Guardian. Upon investigation, they realize Guardian has been poisoned, the only cure for which is the milk from a female Hydra. Charlie, Theodore and Violet find out that they are now qualified Addys and are allowed to upgrade their weapons. 

Charlie retrieves the Hydra's milk and takes it back to the Nightmare Academy. Pinch drinks some of the milk, turning back into a teenager and receiving all his powers back. Pinch portals them to the 5th Ring and they find it swarming with monsters. The group find a frightened boy and take him back to the Academy. But they were tricked; the boy was Slagguron. Slagguron is a Changling, so can change forms for a short time.

Charlie revives the Guardian but cannot stop Tyrannus from escaping to Earth. They decide on a new plan, as Charlie takes the Guardian to the Named's new base. 

In an act of cruelty, Director Drake kills the Guardian. Meanwhile, Pinch killed Verminion, but is shunned away as they blame him for the Guardians death. In a fit of rage and sorrow, Pinch takes Verminion's place and helps the other Named summon the Fifth.

The Fifth is a giant female Nethercreature. She kills all of the Named, but leaves Pinch alive. He joins the enemy. Charlie and friends narrowly escape with their lives, but they have failed. The Fifth is free. The War of the Nether has begun.

American fantasy novels